Gurtam (Belarusian “гуртам” — together) is a developer and provider of software for GPS monitoring, vehicle telematics and fleet management.

As of September 2021, Wialon, the GPS tracking system developed by Gurtam, monitored more than 3 000 000 assets worldwide. The company's business network involves over 2,200 fleet management service providers in more than 130 countries. According to the report of Berg Insight research agency, Wialon is the leading GPS monitoring system in CIS, occupying about 40% of the CIS commercial carrier market.

Operations
The most popular Gurtam services are Wialon Hosting (SaaS) and Wialon Local (server-based solution). 

Gurtam constantly participates in industrial expos and events worldwide including CeBIT, GSMA Mobile World Congress, Securex South Africa, Expo Seguridad Mexico, CTIA, GITEX, Telematics Conference SE Europe etc.

History

Random facts 
In 2009, the company provided Wialon software for vehicle tracking at the international automobile race “A National Sport – Bridge of Friendship”. Further on the company cooperates with other automobile racing coordinators, including those engaged in “Beijing-Paris” multi-stage rally, Can-Am Trophy Russia open off-road ATV-series, “Ukraine Trophy 2012” trophy-raid.

In 2014, Gurtam arranged Kilimanjaro expedition to test hardware and proprietary tracking system in extreme conditions.
According to Berg Insight market research agency, Wialon was recognized a leading satellite monitoring system in the CIS and the Russian Federation in 2014 and 2015.

Since July 2021 Gurtam has joined the IoT M2M Council (IMC) as a Sustaining Member company.

References 

Satellite navigation
Software companies of Lithuania
Vehicle technology